In Christianity, the figures widely recognised as prophets are those mentioned as such in the Old Testament and the New Testament. It is believed that prophets are chosen and called by God. This article lists such prophets. The first list below consists of only those individuals that have been clearly defined as prophets, either by explicit statement or strong contextual implication, (e.g. the purported authors of the books listed as the major prophets and minor prophets) along with the biblical reference to their office. The second list consists of those individuals who are recorded as having had a visionary or prophetic experience, but without a history of any major or consistent prophetic calling. The third list consists of unnamed prophets. The fourth list contains the names of those described in the Bible as prophets, but who are presented as either misusing this gift or as fraudulent. The final list consists of post-biblical individuals regarded as prophets and of post-biblical individuals who are claimed to have had visionary or prophetic experience.

Main list (68)

A
 Aaron (Exodus )
 Abel (Luke )
 Abraham (Hebrews )
 Adam (Genesis )
 Ahijah (1 Kings )
 Amos (one of the 12 Minor Prophets)
 Anna (Luke - Dedication of Jesus) Luke 2:36-38
 Agabus (Acts of the Apostles )
 Asaph (2 Chronicles )
 Azariah (2 Chronicles )
 Azur (Jeremiah )

D
 Daniel (Matthew )
 David (Hebrews )
 Deborah (Judges )

E
 Elijah (1 Kings )
 Eber (Genesis )
 Elisha (2 Kings )
 Enoch (Jude )
 Ezekiel (Ezekiel )
 Ezra (Ezra )

G
 Gad (1 Samuel )
 Gideon ( through )

H
 Habakkuk (Habakkuk 1:1)
 Haggai (Haggai 1:1)
 Hanani (2 Chronicles )
 Hosea (Hosea 1:1)
 Huldah (2 Kings )

I
 Iddo (2 Chronicles )
 Isaac (Genesis )
 Isaiah (2 Kings )
 Ishmael (Genesis )

J

 Jacob (Genesis )
 Jehu (1 Kings )
 Jeremiah (Jeremiah 20:2
 Jethro (Exodus )
 Joel (Acts 2:16)
 John the Baptist (Luke )
 John of Patmos (Revelation )
 Jonah (2 Kings )
 Joshua (Joshua )
 Judas Barsabbas (Acts )
 Job (Job )

L
 Lamech (father of Noah) (Genesis )
 Lucius of Cyrene (Acts 13:1)
 Lot (Genesis )

M
 Malachi (Malachi 1:1)
 Manahen (Acts 13:1)
 Melchizedek
 Micah (Micah 1:1)
 Micaiah (1 Kings )
 Miriam (Book of Exodus )
 Moses (Deuteronomy )

N
 Nahum (Nahum 1:1)
 Nathan (2 Samuel )
 Noah (Genesis )

O
 Obadiah (Obadiah )
 Oded (2 Chronicles ) Father of Azariah the prophet
 Oded (2 Chronicles )

P
 Philip the Evangelist (Acts ) Note: His four daughters also prophesied (Acts 21:8)
 Paul the Apostle (Acts of the Apostles )

S
 Samuel (1 Samuel )
 Shemaiah (1 Kings )
 Silas (Acts )
 Simeon Niger (Acts 13:1)

T
 Two Witnesses (Revelation 11:3)

U
 Uriah (Jeremiah )

Z
 Zechariah, son of Berechiah (Zechariah 1:1)
 Zechariah, son of Jehoiada
 Zephaniah (Zephaniah 1:1)

Biblical people with claimed prophetic experiences
 Ananias of Damascus (Acts )
 Eldad (Numbers )
 Eliezer (2 Chronicles )
 Elisabeth, mother of John the Baptist (Luke )
 Elihu (Job )
 Jahaziel (2 Chronicles )
 Joachim (Luke )
 Joseph (Genesis )
 Joseph, fosterfather of Jesus (Matthew 1:20)
 Mary, mother of Jesus (Luke )
 Medad (Numbers )
 King Nebuchadnezzar of Babylon (Daniel )
 Saul: the first king to unite Israel (1 Samuel )
 Simeon of Jerusalem (Luke )
 Solomon (1 Kings )
 Zechariah, father of John the Baptist (Luke )

Unnamed prophets and men of God 
 A prophet (Judges )
 A man of God (1 Samuel )
 A man of God from Judah (1 Kings )
 An old prophet from Bethel (1 Kings )
 A prophet (1 Kings )
 A man of God (1 Kings )
 One of the sons of the prophets (1 Kings )
 A man of God (2 Chronicles )
 A prophet (2 Chronicles  )
 The seventy elders of Israel (Numbers )

False prophets and prophets of Baal

 Ahab, son of Kolaiah (Jeremiah )
 Antichrist (1 John )
 Balaam (Book of Numbers )
 Elymas (a.k.a. Bar-Jesus)
 Hananiah (Jeremiah )
 Jezebel (Revelation) (Revelation ) (not to be confused with the Jezebel of the Old Testament)
 The false prophet of the Book of Revelation
 The false prophets of Baal (1 Kings )
 Noadiah (Nehemiah )
 Shemaiah the Nehelamite (Jeremiah )
 Simon Magus
 Zedekiah, son of Maaseiah (Jeremiah ) 
 Zedekiah, son of Chenaanah (1 Kings )

Claimed post-biblical prophets
The following persons are considered by some Christians to be prophets, or to have had prophetic experiences.

 Quadratus of Athens (2nd century, sometimes considered one of the seventy apostles)
 Montanus, Prisca, and Maximilla (2nd century, founders of Montanism)
 Quintilla (3rd century, founder of an offshoot movement from Montanism)
 Iarlaithe mac Loga (6th century, founder of the School of Tuam)
 Merlin (6th century, likely invented by Geoffrey of Monmouth from older legends, first appears in the Prophetiae Merlini)
 Palladius of Embrun (6th century, Bishop of Embrun)
 Columba (521–597, credited with spreading Christianity in Scotland)
 Saint Malachy (1094–1148, Archbishop of Armagh and author of Prophecy of the Popes)
 James Salomoni (1231-1314)
 Joan of Arc (1412–1431)
 Nostradamus (1503–1566)
 Justus Velsius (1510-1571, Dutch faith healer who debated against John Calvin)
 Eleanor Davies (poet) (1590–1652)
 Ann Bathurst (17th century, member of the Philadelphians)
 Martha Hatfield (17th century, Puritan)
 John Bull (prophet) and Richard Farnham (17th century, claimed to be the two witnesses of the Book of Revelation)
 Margareta i Kumla (17th century, claimed to have seen angels and demons fight over her soul)
 John Robins (prophet) (17th century, Ranter rescued from Roundhead recourse by recanting his revelations)
 Anne Wentworth (prophetess) (17th century, persecuted by Baptists)
 John Reeve (religious leader) (1608-1658, co-founder of Muggletonianism)
 Lodowicke Muggleton (1609-1698, co-founder of Muggletonianism)
 Mary Cary (prophetess) (1621-1653, supporter of the Fifth Monarchists)
 Eva Margareta Frölich (1650–1692) (Millennialist, pietist author and critic of the Church of Sweden)
 Emanuel Swedenborg (1688–1772, founder of Swedenborgianism)
 Joanna Southcott (1750-1814, author of prophecies kept in a box to be opened in times of national crisis, claimed judgement day would happen in 2004)
 Public Universal Friend (1752–1819, preacher who claims to have died and been reborn without gender)
 George Rapp (1757-1847, founder of the Harmony Society)
 John Ward (prophet) (1781–1837, claimed successor of Joanna Southcott)
 William Miller (preacher) (1782–1849, founder of Adventism)
 John Wroe (1782–1863, founder of the Christian Israelite Church)
 Bernhard Müller (1788-1834, founder of an offshoot from the Harmony Society, that would later start the Germantown Colony)
 Helena Ekblom (1790–1859, Swedish preacher who was put in an asylum for refusing to comply with the Church of Sweden's doctrines)
 Joseph Smith (1805–1844, founder of the Latter Day Saint movement)
 Hong Xiuquan (1814-1864, founder of the Taiping Heavenly Kingdom)
 John Bosco (1815–1888, founder of the Salesians of Don Bosco)
 Mary Baker Eddy (1821–1910, founder of Christian Science)
 Ellen G. White (1827–1915, co-founder of the Seventh-day Adventist Church)
 John Alexander Dowie (1847–1907, founder of the Christ Community Church)
 Nona L. Brooks (1861-1945, founder of the Church of Divine Science)
 Siener van Rensburg (1864-1926, advisor to Koos de la Rey, influenced the Suidlanders)
 E. W. Kenyon (1867–1948, possible line of transmission between the New Thought and Word of Faith movements)
 Helena Konttinen (1871-1916, a "Sleeping preacher" who started a revivalist movement)
 Felix Manalo (1886-1963, founder of the Iglesia ni Cristo)
 Padre Pio (1887–1968, Catholic saint, purportedly predicted the papacy of John Paul II)
 William M. Branham (1909–1965, influence on televangelism)
 A. A. Allen (1911–1970, Pentecostal evangelist and faith healer)
 Kenneth Hagin (1917–2003, pioneer of the Word of Faith movement)
 Oral Roberts (1918–2009, considered the godfather of the charismatic movement, founder of the Oral Roberts Evangelistic Association and Oral Roberts University)
 T. L. Osborn (1923–2013, Pentecostal evangelist and musician)
 Pat Robertson (1930–present, chairman of the Christian Broadcasting Network, host of The 700 Club, noted for controversial statements)
 David Wilkerson (1931–2011, author of The Cross and the Switchblade and founder of the Teen Challenge)
 Reverend Ike (1935-2009, noted for his slogan "You can't lose with the stuff I use!")
 Kenneth Copeland (1936–present day, televangelist noted advocate of prosperity theology, and for claiming to have ended the COVID-19 pandemic)
 Robert Tilton (1946–present day, televangelist noted for his prosperity theology infomercials and questionable fundraising practices).
 Roch Thériault (1947-2011, founder of a polygamous doomsday cult called the Ant Hill Kids)
 John Paul Jackson (1950-2015, author noted for dream interpretation)
 Benny Hinn (1952–present day, televangelist noted for faith healing and prosperity theology)
 David Koresh (1959–1993, leader of the Branch Davidians during the Waco siege)
 Creflo Dollar (1962–present day, televangelist noted for prosperity theology)
 T. B. Joshua (1963–2021, televangelist and founder of Synagogue, Church of All Nations)
 Joshua Iginla (1969–present day, televangelist, prosperity theology preacher, and megachurch pastor)
 Jeremiah Omoto Fufeyin (1972–present day, founder of the Christ Mercyland Deliverance Ministry, criticized for flamboyant ministry)
 Daniel Obinim (1977–present day, minister noted for controversial actions and statements)

See also
 Bible prophecy
 Biblical and Quranic narratives
 List of Book of Mormon prophets
 List of people in both the Bible and the Quran
 Old Testament messianic prophecies quoted in the New Testament
 Prophets and messengers in Islam
 Prophets in Judaism
 Table of prophets of Abrahamic religions

References

 
Bible-related lists of people